Opinion polling has been conducted in El Salvador since September 2019, three months after President Nayib Bukele took office on 1 June 2019, to gauge public opinion of Bukele and his government. Despite negative reception from outside of El Salvador, domestically, Bukele is considered to be one of the most popular presidents in Salvadoran history as his approval ratings generally hover around 90 percent.

Presidential approval rating

Polling on the 2022 gang crackdown

2024 re-election polling

References 

Nayib Bukele
Opinion polling in El Salvador